= Oblivantsy =

Baptism method

Oblivantsy (from Russian: обливанцы) is a word still used by Old Believers for those who practise the baptism by sprinkling water, as in Catholic Church, rather than by submerging the whole body three times, as the Old Believers insist on. The Russian Orthodox Church practises both ways of baptizing and, subsequently, recognizes baptism both by sprinkling and submerging.

== Sources and references ==
- Мельников, Фёдор Ефимович "Блуждающее богословие," Москва, 1911, Барнаул 2002 / Mel'nikov Fyodor Yefimovich "Erring Theology," Moscow, 1911, Barnaul 2002 (Russian)
- Вургафт С.Г., Ушаков И.А. Старообрядчество. Лица, события, предметы и символы. Опыт энциклопедического словаря, Москва 1996 / Vurgaft S.G., Ušakov I.A. Old Believers. Persons, Events, Objects and Symbols. Attempt to an Encyclopedian Dictionary. Moscow, 1996 (Russian)
